Armands Šķēle (born September 4, 1983) is a former Latvian professional basketball player. He was a member of Latvian National Team. He earned praise from fans for his artistic style of play that thrived on creativity and unorthodox moves. During his career Šķēle was nicknamed "Big Time", mainly due to his skills and personality.

Professional career
Šķēle started his professional career playing for Brocēni which at the time was the top team in Latvia. In 2001, he moved to Poland signing a multi-year contract with Anwil Włocławek. Under the guidance of head coach Andrej Urlep, Šķēle developed rapidly and become one of the most attractive players in the Europe - his game was compared to Serbian star Aleksandar Đorđević. 

In 2004, he was pursued by Real Madrid as they sought talented Latvian to back-up Louis Bullock, but the deal fell through as both sides couldn't find an agreement. In the same year Šķēle declared for the NBA Draft.

Despite having a contract with Anwil, Šķēle didn't return to his former team and was loaned out. Thus, for the next two seasons he played in two different Belgian clubs. In the summer of 2006, he was bought out from contract with Anwil by Latvian side Barons LMT. He played three seasons with Barons. In 2008, Šķēle led his team to the FIBA EuroCup and the Latvian Basketball League championships.

In October 2009, he moved to Lega A club Basket Napoli. However, the team from Naples had financial trouble and after a few months it went bankrupt. Šķēle finished the season with BK Ventspils. The next season, he waited eight months till early 2011 when he signed with Ferro-ZNTU from Ukraine. After a single game, the Ukrainian club broke the agreement citing fears about Šķēle's health. Soon after his short stint in Ukraine, Šķēle moved to Estonia by signing with BC Kalev/Cramo. Šķēle went on and played three seasons for Kalev/Cramo, winning Estonian championship in each year.

In April 2012, during Estonian League playoff game he made a behind-the-back shot that became a very popular video amassing multiple-million views online.

In September 2013, after playing for Latvian National Team in EuroBasket 2013, he joined Kalev/Cramo for the fourth season. On November 25, 2013, he signed with Turkish team Gamateks Pamukkale Üniversitesi.

For the 2014–15 season, he returned to Kalev/Cramo.

In October 2015, Armands joined Valmiera/ORDO, uniting with his younger brother Aigars. Armands led underdog Valmiera to its first ever Latvian championship in 2015–16. He won one more Latvian championship with VEF Rīga in 2016–17 and was a key player to help his team make the VTB League playoffs.

Latvian National Team
Armands Šķēle made his Latvian National Team debut in 2002. He has played at EuroBasket 2003, EuroBasket 2005, EuroBasket 2007, EuroBasket 2009 and EuroBasket 2013. In total, he made 99 appearances for the National Team.

Family
His younger brother, Aigars, is also a professional basketball player.

Autobiography
In December 2020, Šķēle's autobiography, Starp dzīvi un basketbolu, was published. In it, Šķēle talks about his career and various events that took place in his life.

Honours
1998–99 Latvian League (BK Brocēni)
2002–03 Polish League (Anwil Włocławek)
2004–05 Belgian Cup (Liège Basket)
2004–05 Belgian SuperCup (Liège Basket)
2007–08 Latvian League (Barons LMT)
2007–08 FIBA EuroCup (Barons LMT)
2010–11 Estonian League (BC Kalev/Cramo)
2011–12 Estonian League (BC Kalev/Cramo)
2012–13 Estonian League (BC Kalev/Cramo)
2015–16 Latvian League (Valmiera/ORDO)
2016–17 Latvian League (VEF Rīga)

References

External links
Euroleague Profile
FIBA Europe Profile
Eurobasket 2013 Profile
Amazing Three-Point Shot by Armands Šķēle

1983 births
Living people
Basket Napoli players
BC Kalev/Cramo players
BC Zaporizhya players
BK Barons players
BK Valmiera players
BK VEF Rīga players
BK Ventspils players
Latvian expatriate basketball people in Estonia
KK Włocławek players
Latvian men's basketball players
Liège Basket players
Point guards
Shooting guards
Spirou Charleroi players
Basketball players from Riga
Korvpalli Meistriliiga players